Arema–Persib Bandung rivalry or Western Blue and Eastern Blue derby is the name given in football to any match between two Indonesian football clubs in two different league background, Persib Bandung (Perserikatan) and Arema FC (Galatama). The fierce competition between both teams began in 1990 when Arema FC and Persib Bandung face off in the semifinals 1990 Jawa Pos II Cup.

Persib Bandung and Arema FC were established on different era, at which Persib was formed in 1933, while Arema in 1987. Both teams have groups of supporters who are equally well-known fanatics, namely Bobotoh (Persib Bandung) and Aremania (Arema FC). Both supporters have also been known for their psywar, conducted throughout the game, making the rivalrous match much awaited.

History
Actually there is no rivalry between the two clubs and supporters. However, the current condition is due to block-blocking that has occurred among Indonesian supporters. But according to supporters this match is a match that determines who is the best blue club in among them. Violence between Aremania and Bobotoh were occurred several times. On 11 September 2022, Arema hosted at least 500 Persib supporters at Kanjuruhan Stadium for the first time since both sides clashed in the 2000s and were never given a quota for the away supporter.

Results

Official match results 
Data incomplete

The record counts all competitions (league, official tournament and pre-season tournament) including matches played during the era of dualism.

Players in both teams
Note: 
 Players in bold are still active

Moving from Arema to Persib

Moving from Persib to Arema

Head coaches who coached for both clubs

Notes

References

Arema F.C.
Persib Bandung
Football rivalries in Indonesia
Football in Indonesia
Liga 1 (Indonesia)